Elsie Anne McKee is an Archibald Alexander Professor of Reformation Studies and the History of Worship at Princeton Theological Seminary. She is famous for the Study of John Calvin.

References 

Living people
Princeton Theological Seminary faculty
Year of birth missing (living people)
Place of birth missing (living people)